Shelley's francolin (Scleroptila shelleyi) is a species of bird in the family Phasianidae.  The species is named after Sir Edward Shelley, cousin of George Ernest Shelley. IOC 13.1 recognized the following subspecies:

S. s. uluensis
S. s. macarthuri
S. s. shelleyi

Distribution and habitat
It is found in grassy woodlands and grasslands in Kenya, Mozambique, Rwanda, South Africa, Eswatini, Tanzania, Uganda, and Zimbabwe.

References

External links
 Shelley's Francolin - Species text in The Atlas of Southern African Birds

Shelley's francolin
Birds of Sub-Saharan Africa
Shelley's francolin
Taxonomy articles created by Polbot